The Mississippi was an important military highway that bordered ten states, roughly equally divided between Union and Confederate loyalties.

Both sides soon realised that control of the river was a crucial strategic priority. Confederate general Braxton Bragg said "The river is of more importance to us than all the country together." In April 1862, the Union secured two key points, New Orleans at the mouth of the river and a double-bend on the Kentucky-Tennessee line, leaving only the middle section in Confederate hands. When the major river-ports of Memphis and Vicksburg fell (followed automatically by Port Hudson), the liberation of the Mississippi was complete, and Abraham Lincoln declared "The Father of Waters again goes unvexed to the sea."

This split the Confederacy in two, with the western half forced to operate as a separate department, the Trans-Mississippi Theater, greatly inhibiting supplies and communications, and tilting the odds decisively in favour of the Union.

State loyalties
Minnesota, Wisconsin, Iowa and Illinois were solidly pro-Union, despite some ‘Copperhead’ (Peace Democrat) sentiment in the last-named. Missouri was a slave-state, beset with guerrilla fighting throughout the war, with a Confederate government-in-exile. Kentucky, also a slave-state (and Lincoln’s birthplace), was briefly claimed by the Confederacy during a short-lived dual government, but never left the Union. Slave-holding Tennessee was Confederate, though the eastern counties harboured much pro-Union sentiment. Arkansas had initially stayed in the Union, but resented Lincoln’s demand for troops, and seceded. Mississippi was deeply Confederate, as was Louisiana, though in the latter case, New Orleans came under a Union government within a Confederate state, following the fall of the city in April 1862.

Plans for control of the river

At the outbreak of war, the Union General-in-Chief, Winfield Scott, proposed an advance down the Mississippi that would cut the Confederacy in two, though the necessary rivercraft had yet to be built. Along with the policy of blockading the entire Southern coastline, the plan was derided as the ‘Anaconda’, slowly constricting the life out of the Confederacy. Most Union generals believed that the war could be won quickly by an early march on Richmond, while the commander in the west, General Henry Halleck, considered the Tennessee River to be more significant than the Mississippi. Also Winfield Scott would soon be retiring. Eventually, however, the strengths of the plan were increasingly recognised, and it became Union strategy.

As the Confederate Navy had to build almost its entire fleet from scratch, its operations on the Mississippi would be largely defensive.

The Battles

New Madrid/Island Number Ten (28 February  –  8 April, 1862)

The Confederates had fortified a tight double-bend in the river, with garrisons at New Madrid, Missouri, and Island Number Ten. Union Major-General  John Pope arrived unexpectedly, before winter was over, easily took New Madrid, and then ordered two gunboats to run the island batteries, covering his crossing to the east (Tennessee) bank, whereupon the outnumbered enemy surrendered.

New Orleans (16-28 April 1862)
Captain David Farragut of the Union Navy’s West Gulf Blockading Squadron attacked the city’s outer fortifications, Fort Jackson and Fort St. Philip, at first obstructed by a defensive boom. When the boom was broken by gunboats, the fleet forced its way in, opposed by ironclads and fire-rafts, eventually enabling the infantry to occupy the city and set up a Union government for the rest of the war.

Memphis (6 June 1862)
The Memphis garrison had been much depleted, following the Union capture of the rail junction at Corinth, so the Union fleet was opposed only by Confederate gunboats and rams, poorly equipped, which were destroyed in two hours. One Union boat, Queen of the West, was disabled. The Union forces were able to capture and repair four Confederate craft for their own use.

Baton Rouge (5 August 1862)
Confederate area commander Earl Van Dorn had been hoping to re-take Louisiana’s abandoned state capital Baton Rouge. A force under Maj. Gen. John C. Breckinridge attacked at dawn, killing Union commander Thomas Williams, and driving his men into defensive lines, protected by their gunboats. But a Confederate ram had broken down and it became a one-sided naval battle, forcing Breckinridge to withdraw.

Vicksburg (December 26, 1862 - July 4, 1863)
After several failed initiatives, including an attempt to divert the river itself, General U.S. Grant marched down the west (Louisiana) bank, accompanied by gunboats that managed to run the Vicksburg batteries and ferry his army across to the east bank. From there, he pursued the enemy into their lines and besieged them until they surrendered.

Principal actions:

Snyder’s Bluff (April 29 – May 1)
 Diversionary feint to distract the Confederates from sending support downstream to Grand Gulf. A Union fleet moved up the Yazoo, attracting heavy fire, before retreating through the swampy terrain.

Port Gibson (May 1)
After crossing to the east bank at Bruinsburg, Grant drove the Confederates back from one defensive position to the next, establishing a beachhead and forcing the enemy to abandon the port of Grand Gulf.

Jackson (May 14)
Grant’s move on the Mississippi state capital caused Confederate General Joseph E. Johnston to evacuate the city, enabling Grant to destroy its factories and rail communications.

Champion Hill (May 16)
Seen as the pivotal battle of the campaign. The Confederates occupied a high vantage-point, led by Brig. Gen. Lloyd Tilghman, who died in action, but Grant swept them off the crest.

Big Black River Bridge (May 17)
Confederates’ last chance to avoid being driven back into their lines. General Pemberton took a position on the river, but was routed by Grant, burning the bridges as he went, but losing many prisoners.

Port Hudson (May 22 – July 9, 1863)
General Nathaniel Banks had been ordered upstream to aid General U.S. Grant who was besieging Vicksburg. His orders were to capture Port Hudson, the only other remaining Confederate stronghold on the river, but his assault failed, and he settled into a siege  -  at 48 days, the longest in American history up till then. The eventual Confederate surrender completed the liberation of the river.

See also 

 Wisconsin in the American Civil War
 Iowa in the American Civil War
 Illinois in the American Civil War
 Missouri in the American Civil War
 Kentucky in the American Civil War
 Tennessee in the American Civil War
 Arkansas in the American Civil War
 Mississippi in the American Civil War
 Louisiana in the American Civil War

References

Military history of the American Civil War
Maritime history of the United States
Union Navy
Confederate States Navy
Civil War